William Francis Arnold (13 August 1877 – 25 December 1943) was an Australian rules footballer who played with South Melbourne in the Victorian Football League (VFL).

After his football career Arnold served in France during World War I, being wounded in the arm, neck and right lung during three years of active service.

Notes

External links 

1877 births
1943 deaths
Australian rules footballers from Melbourne
Sydney Swans players
Australian military personnel of World War I
Military personnel from Melbourne
People from South Melbourne